Jacqueline Sara Rowarth   is a New Zealand agronomist, dairy farmer and science administrator.

Career

Rowarth has an Agricultural Science degree with first class honours in Environmental Agriculture, and obtained a PhD in Soil science from Massey University, with a 1987 thesis titled  'Phosphate cycling in grazed hill-country pasture ' . Rowarth taught Plant Science at Lincoln University. She returned to New Zealand to Massey University as full professor.

In October 2016 Rowarth became  the first Chief Scientist of the Environmental Protection Authority. In 2018  Rowarth resigned from her role at the Environmental Protection Authority. It was later revealed that the EPA was warned her behaviour was damaging trust in the organisation, apparently due to comments to the media. According to Rowarth she was often misquoted.

As of 2021, Rowarth is a farmer-elected representative on the board of DairyNZ. She is currently a director of DairyNZ.

Rowarth has criticized veganism. She has argued that a vegan diet will not save the planet from climate change and has also argued that an omnivorous diet including a moderate amount of dairy products and meat delivers the required nutrients per person for least environmental impact.

Recognition
Companion of the New Zealand Order of Merit, for services to agricultural science, in the 2008 Queen's Birthday Honours

References

Year of birth missing (living people)
Living people
Companions of the New Zealand Order of Merit
Companions of the Royal Society of New Zealand
Critics of veganism
Academic staff of the Lincoln University (New Zealand)
Massey University alumni
Academic staff of the Massey University
New Zealand soil scientists
New Zealand women academics
Academic staff of the University of Waikato